Michael Joseph Egan, Jr. (August 8, 1926 – January 7, 2016) was an American lawyer and politician who served as a member of the Georgia General Assembly and as the first United States associate attorney general.

Early life and education
Egan was born to Elise (Robider) and Michael Joseph Egan on August 8, 1926, in Savannah, Georgia. The grandson of an Irish immigrant, the Egans had resided in Savannah for generations. Egan attended elementary school taught by the Marist Brothers. He left home to attended prep school in Portsmouth, Rhode Island at Portsmouth Priory School, and graduated in 1945. That same year, Egan was drafted into the United States Army in the concluding year of World War II and was commissioned a second lieutenant, serving in the 86th Infantry Division. Egan was discharged in 1947, after the war's end, and enrolled in Yale University, graduating in 1950. During the Korean War, Egan was promoted to the rank of first lieutenant and recalled to active duty, serving in the 2nd Infantry Division until his discharge in 1952. He then entered Harvard Law School, receiving his law degree in 1955.

Career 
After graduating from law school, Egan returned to Georgia and established a law practice in Atlanta.

Egan was first elected to the Georgia House of Representatives in 1966 and served until 1977. In 1977, Egan resigned from the House when he was appointed United States associate attorney general, by President Jimmy Carter. In 1979, Egan resumed his law practice.

In 1988, he ran for a seat in the Georgia State Senate in a special election, to replace Senator Paul Coverdell who was appointed to the position of director of the Peace Corps by President George H. W. Bush on May 2, 1989. Egan was elected to Coverdell's vacated Senate seat in June, 1989. He served in the Senate, representing District 40 in Metropolitan Atlanta from 1989 to 2001. Egan's willingness to occasionally support an unpopular cause, driven to do so by his own set of ethics, won the respect of colleagues, Republicans and Democrats alike. He became known as "the conscience of the senate" by his Republican colleagues.

After his legislative career ended, Egan, who had retired from active practice with the Atlanta law firm of Sutherland Asbill and Brennan, continued his affiliation with the firm in "as counsel" capacity. In 2001, he was one of the first people appointed to the newly created Metropolitan North Georgia Water Planning District by Governor Roy Barnes. Egan also served on the board of the Trust for Public Land.

Death 
Egan died at his home on January 7, 2016, at the age of 89.

Notes

1926 births
2016 deaths
Politicians from Atlanta
Politicians from Savannah, Georgia
Military personnel from Georgia (U.S. state)
Yale University alumni
Harvard Law School alumni
Georgia (U.S. state) lawyers
United States Associate Attorneys General
Republican Party Georgia (U.S. state) state senators
Republican Party members of the Georgia House of Representatives
20th-century American lawyers
Portsmouth Abbey School alumni
United States Army personnel of World War II
United States Army personnel of the Korean War
United States Army officers